Jilin Provincial Experimental School is a coeducational public middle school for both boarding and day students from grades 7 to 12 (ages 12 to 18).  Founded in 1948, the school was originally located in Jilin City of Jilin, Northeast China. In 1955, along with the Provincial Government, the School moved to the new capital city Changchun. It is a key high school in Jilin Province and is listed the Top 100 Chinese High Schools

History

Academics

Notable alumni
Yi Sha, Chinese mainland actor.

References

Official Website of Jilin Provincial Experimental School

High schools in Jilin